Christopher Chrishan Dotson, better known by his stage name, Chrishan or Prince Chrishan is an American Grammy-nominated singer-songwriter and record producer. He is best known for writing and producing Meek Mill's "Dangerous" featuring PnB Rock & Jeremih and for co-writing "Look Back at It by A Boogie wit da Hoodie.

Early life 
Chrishan was born in Toledo, Ohio and grew up in Minneapolis, Minnesota. He attended High School for Recording Arts in St. Paul, Minnesota.

Personal life 
Chrishan is the nephew of singer Lyfe Jennings. Chrishan's brother was murdered in February 2017 in Toledo, Ohio.

Discography

Production Discography

References

1989 births
Living people
Musicians from Minneapolis
Singer-songwriters from Minnesota